The 1996–97 Western Professional Hockey League season was the first season of the Western Professional Hockey League, a North American minor pro league. Six teams participated in the regular season, and the El Passo Buzzards were the league champions.

Regular season

President's Cup-Playoffs

External links
 Season 1996/97 on hockeydb.com

Western Professional Hockey League seasons
WPHL